Neil McGregor may refer to

 Neil McGregor, born 1985, Scottish footballer
 Neil McGregor (film director), Australian film director
 Neil McGregor (rugby union), 1901–1973, New Zealand rugby player

See also
 Neil MacGregor, (born 1946), British art historian
 McGregor (surname)
 MacGregor (surname)